Atta Mohammad Hami (1919-1982) was a Pakistani poet, writer and scholar. He wrote a PhD dissertation about Talpurs titled The role of Talpurs in literature, politics and culture which is recognized one of the prominent research works covering their contribution or role in politics, literature and culture.

References

1919 births
1982 deaths
Pakistani scholars
Pakistani poets